Boukan Ginen is a mizik rasin band from the city of Port-au-Prince, Haiti. Boukan is the Haitian Creole word for "bonfire" or "fire pit". Ginen is a specific Haitian name for the ancestral home of enslaved Africans.

History

Boukan Ginen won the prize for best carnival song at the 1991 Carnival in Port-au-Prince, for their performance of "Pale Pale W", a song later released on their debut album, Jou a Rive. The song title means "talk" and included lyrics widely interpreted as supporting the presidency of Jean-Bertrand Aristide. The band's music was suppressed by the military authority of the junta led by Raoul Cédras that ruled the country from 1991 to 1994.

In 1994, Boukan Ginen became the third Haitian musical group to receive the Prix Découverte from Radio France International.

Discography

References
Cited References

Haitian musical groups